Desire, I Want to Turn Into You is the fourth studio album by American singer-songwriter and producer Caroline Polachek, and second under her given name. It was released on February 14, 2023 by Sony Music, The Orchard, and Polachek's imprint Perpetual Novice.

It was supported by the singles "Bunny Is a Rider", "Billions", "Sunset", "Welcome to My Island", and "Blood and Butter". The cover art was shot by Aidan Zamiri.

Background
After releasing Pang in late 2019, Polachek was set to tour the record, but was cut short by the COVID-19 pandemic in March 2020. Polachek stayed in London and began work on Desire, I Want to Turn Into You with close collaborator Danny L Harle. She considers the album to be a major partnership with Harle, as the record has "few other collaborators in the mix." She continued work on the album in London until mid-2021, where she briefly relocated to Barcelona alongside Harle and new collaborator Sega Bodega.

In November 2021, Polachek was featured on Charli XCX's "New Shapes" alongside Christine and the Queens. She then embarked on a North American tour with French musician Oklou for the remainder of 2021.

Dua Lipa announced Polachek as a supporting act on the North American and Canadian legs of the Future Nostalgia Tour from February to July 2022, performing at many festivals as well. Polachek was featured on Flume's "Sirens" in March, and wrote and produced the track "Afar" for PC Music artist Hyd in July. She rescheduled European tour dates to finish work on Desire, I Want to Turn Into You.

Six weeks ahead of the album release, in an interview with The Guardian, Polachek confirmed three more song titles: "Blood and Butter", "Pretty in Possible", and "Smoke".

Composition
Desire, I Want to Turn Into You has been described as an art pop, alternative pop, and new-age record, with elements of electronic, rock, and trip-hop.
 Shaad D'Souza of The Guardian wrote: "Ratcheting up both the fantastical elements of its predecessor as well as its humour and pop instinct, Desire is an eclectic, elaborate and cheekily deranged sequel, and one of the year's most anticipated releases". The album features bagpipes, children's choirs, Spanish guitar, "beats that run the gamut" from Ray of Light-style trip-hop to dembow, Celtic folk, and early '00s-style radio pop. Polachek herself described it as "a very maximalist album".

Release 
Desire, I Want to Turn Into You was announced in December 2022.

Singles 
Polachek released the lead single "Bunny Is a Rider" in July 2021, which was written before she went into lockdown. She released the trip hop inspired "Billions" as a single in February. Polachek stated the song took 19 months to finish. The single featured a rework of "Long Road Home", her collaboration with Oneohtrix Point Never from his 2020 album Magic Oneohtrix Point Never, as the B-side. "Sunset" was released as a single in October. Polachek has cited Ennio Morricones Spaghetti Western film scores as an influence on the song. "Welcome to My Island", which Polachek calls her "brattiest song to date", was released alongside the album announcement. On January 20, a remix by Charli XCX and the 1975's George Daniel was released. "Blood and Butter" was released on January 31, 2023.

Critical reception 

Upon release, Desire, I Want to Turn Into You received widespread critical acclaim from music critics. At Metacritic, which assigns a normalized rating out of 100 to reviews from mainstream critics, the album received an average score of 93, based on 18 critical reviews, indicating "universal acclaim".

Cat Zhang of Pitchfork wrote that the album was the best of Polachek's career, giving it the distinction of "Best New Music." Rolling Stone also reviewed the album positively, calling it a "kinetic example of what happens when pop sets out to transcend its own limits."

In a mixed review for NME, Ella Kemp praised Polachek's experimentation but said that some tracks "suffer[ed] from a more abstract vision" and called the album an "uneven collection."

Track listing
All tracks are written and produced by Caroline Polachek and Danny L Harle, except where noted.

Notes
  signifies a co-producer

Personnel
 Caroline Polachek – lead vocals, guitar (track 1)
 Danny L Harle – bass (track 3)
 Nico Harle – additional vocals (track 3)
 Marc López Fernández – guitar (track 4)
 Samuel Organ – guitar (track 4)
 Miquel Mestres – guitar (track 7)
 Brìghde Chaimbeul – bagpipes (track 8)
 Kirin J Callinan – guitar (track 8)
 Trinity Croydon Choir – additional vocals (tracks 10, 12)

Charts

References

2023 albums
Albums produced by A. G. Cook
Albums produced by Caroline Polachek
Albums produced by Dan Nigro
Albums produced by Danny L Harle
Caroline Polachek albums
The Orchard (company) albums